Roman Dostál (born 13 July 1970) is a former Czech biathlete. He became a Biathlon World Champion on the 20 km in 2005. The victory itself was very surprising because he has never managed to come among the top three in any World Cup competition. Dostál retired after the 2009–10 season.

Biathlon results
All results are sourced from the International Biathlon Union.

Olympic Games

*Mass start was added as an event in 2006.

World Championships
2 medals (1 gold, 1 silver)

*During Olympic seasons competitions are only held for those events not included in the Olympic program.
**Team was removed as an event in 1998, and pursuit was added in 1997 with mass start being added in 1999 and the mixed relay in 2005.

Individual victories
1 victory (1 In)

*Results are from UIPMB and IBU races which include the Biathlon World Cup, Biathlon World Championships and the Winter Olympic Games.

References

External links
 
 

1970 births
Living people
Czechoslovak male biathletes
Czech male biathletes
Biathletes at the 2006 Winter Olympics
Biathletes at the 2002 Winter Olympics
Biathletes at the 2010 Winter Olympics
Olympic biathletes of the Czech Republic
Biathlon World Championships medalists
People from Ústí nad Orlicí
Sportspeople from the Pardubice Region